Guglielmo Adeodato (died 1540) was a Roman Catholic prelate who served as Bishop of Lesina (1539–1540).

Biography
On 17 October 1539, Guglielmo Adeodato was appointed during the papacy of Paul III as Bishop of Lesina.
He served as Bishop of Lesina until his death in 1540.

References 

16th-century Italian Roman Catholic bishops
Bishops appointed by Pope Paul III
1540 deaths